Forbidden Fruit is a 1921 American silent drama film directed by Cecil B. DeMille, and starring Agnes Ayres, Forrest Stanley, Clarence Burton, and Kathlyn Williams.  It is a remake of the 1915 film The Golden Chance, which was also directed by DeMille. The film survives in prints at George Eastman House and the Library of Congress.

Plot
Mrs. Mallory (Williams) persuades Mary Maddock (Ayres), her unhappily married seamstress, to take the place of an absent guest at her dinner party so that her husband can complete a business deal with Nelson Rogers (Stanley) rather than make his trip out West. Gorgeously gowned and very beautiful, Mary wins the heart of Nelson at the party, who asks her to marry him. Mary realizes what she is missing and remains faithful to her abusive and idle husband Steve Maddock (Burton), whom she supports. After a final insult from him (throwing a shoe at her bird that knocks the cage out a window to its death), she remains with the Mallorys, who need her for a weekend with Nelson. During that night she is awakened to find a burglar, her husband, stealing Mrs. Mallory's jewels. Steve escapes but Mary tells the Mallorys that the thief was her husband. She refuses the Mallorys' suggestion to divorce Steve who then attempts to blackmail Nelson for $10,000, which he plans to divide with a crooked partner (the butler of the Mallorys). In a fight over the money, the partner kills Steve, leaving Mary free to marry Nelson.

Cast
 Agnes Ayres as Mary Maddock
 Clarence Burton as Steve Maddock
 Theodore Roberts as James Harrington Mallory
 Kathlyn Williams as Mrs. Mallory
 Forrest Stanley as Nelson Rogers
 Theodore Kosloff as Pietro Giuseppe
 Shannon Day as Nadia Craig
 Bertram Johns as John Craig
 Julia Faye as Maid
 William Boyd (uncredited)

References

External links

1921 films
1921 drama films
American black-and-white films
Silent American drama films
Remakes of American films
American silent feature films
Articles containing video clips
Famous Players-Lasky films
Films directed by Cecil B. DeMille
Paramount Pictures films
Surviving American silent films
1920s English-language films
1920s American films